Procolophonomorpha is an order or clade containing most parareptiles. Many papers have applied various definitions to the name, though most of these definitions have since been considered synonymous with modern parareptile clades such as Ankyramorpha and Procolophonia. The current definition of Procolophonomorpha, as defined by Modesto, Scott, & Reisz (2009), is that of as a stem-based group containing Procolophon and all taxa more closely related to it than to Milleretta. It constitutes a diverse assemblage that includes a number of lizard-like forms, as well as more diverse types such as the pareiasaurs. Lee 1995, 1996, 1997 argues that turtles evolved from pareiasaurs, but this view is no longer considered likely. Rieppel and deBraga 1996 and deBraga and Rieppel, 1997 argue that turtles evolved from sauropterygians, and there is both molecular and fossil (Pappochelys) evidence for the origin of turtles among diapsid reptiles.

Classification 
The following cladogram is simplified after the phylogenetic analysis of MacDougall and Reisz (2014) and shows the placement of Procolophonomorpha within Parareptilia and its interrelationships. Relationships within bolded terminal clades are not shown.

References
 Carroll, R. L., 1988: Appendix; Vertebrate Classification. in Carroll, R. L. 1988: Vertebrate Paleontology and Evolution, W. H. Freeman and Company, New York
 deBraga M. and O. Rieppel. 1997. "Reptile phylogeny and the interrelationships of turtles". Zoological Journal of the Linnean Society 120: 281–354.
 deBraga, M. and Reisz, R. R., 1996: "The Early Permian reptile Acleistorhinus pteroticus and its phylogenetic position". Journal of Vertebrate Paleontology: Vol. 16, #3, pp. 384–395 
 Laurin, M., and Gauthier, J. A., 1996 Phylogeny and Classification of Amniotes, at the Tree of Life Web Project
 Lee, M. S. Y. 1995. "Historical burden in systematics and the interrelationships of 'Parareptiles'". Biological Reviews of the Cambridge Philosophical Society 70: 459–547. 
 Lee M. S. Y. 1996. "Correlated progression and the origin of turtles". Nature 379: 812–815.
 Lee, M. S. Y., 1997: "Pareiasaur phylogeny and the origin of turtles". Zoological Journal of the Linnean Society: Vol. 120, pp. 197–280
 Rieppel O. and M. deBraga. 1996. "Turtles as diapsid reptiles". Nature 384: 453–455.

External links
 Basal Anapsids – Palaeos

Procolophonomorphs
Prehistoric animal orders
Guadalupian first appearances
Late Triassic extinctions